The Hainan people, also known as Hainam nang (pronounced in Hainanese) or Hainanese people, is a geographic term referring to the natives of Hainan, the southernmost and smallest Chinese province. The term "Hainanese" was frequently used to refer to all natives of Hainan island. Hainam Min speakers often refer to themselves as Qiongwen to distinguish themselves from other groups of Hainan such as the Cantonese, the Tanka, the Hlai, etc.

History

Most Hainam Han people were originally fishers from nearby later settled in the island of Hainan, while the Lingaoese, Hlai, Tanka invaded the island earlier and were descendants of the Yue tribe.

Later on Hainam Min-speaking colonists arrived and colonized Hainam island from the three districts of Xinghua Prefecture of Fujian, chasing the native aborigines to the impoverished mountain areas. As a result of the assimilation of other dialect groups, many Hainanese genetically cluster with Han Chinese from Guangdong and Guangxi instead of Fujianese people.

Similarly to Fujian and Guangdong provinces, Hainan has been a source for immigrants. Towards the turn of the 20th century, many Hainanese migrated to various Southeast Asian nations, where they worked as cooks, restaurateurs, coffee shop owners, clothes makers, sailors and hoteliers. Chan Sing, one of the "villain" movie stars that dotted the Hong Kong movie industry was of Hainanese ancestry, as was the bartender who invented the world-famous Singapore Sling at the renowned Singapore Raffles Hotel, Mr. Ngiam Tong Boon. In Thailand, prime minister Pote Sarasin, Bank president Boonchu Rojanastien, singer Nichkhun of 2PM, media mogul Sondhi Limthongkul, the politically influential Sarasin family, as well as two of the wealthiest business families, the Chirathivats and the Yoovidhyas, all trace their ancestries to Hainan. In Laos, former deputy prime minister Somsavat Lengsavad is also of Hainanese descent. Singapore minister politicians Lawrence Wong, Lee Chiaw Meng, Cedric Foo, Chin Harn Tong and Mah Bow Tan are also Hainams.

Culture

Language
In Hainan, the local lingua franca is referred to as Hainanese. Numerous Wenchang Hainanese descended from Jinshi and merchants from Putian as many of their Jiapu (family genealogies) show.  Standard Chinese is also the lingua franca in the island province as in the rest of China.

Cuisine

Numerous signature dishes such as the Hainanese chicken rice, Wenchang chicken, Hainanese pork chop, Hainanese mutton soup, Hainanese salted fish soup and beef noodle soup. Hainanese chicken rice is a recognised dish throughout Southeast Asia due to the Hainanese diaspora in these areas who famed it.

All these signature dishes are served at the various eateries located along Purvis Street, within the Hainanese enclave; as a result, Purvis Street is often referred to as "Hainan Second Street", while Middle Road and Seah Street are referred to as "Hainan First Street" and "Hainan Third Street" respectively. It is often labelled as Singapore's national dish.

Arts
Hainanese opera (Qiong opera) is a passion for many Hainanese, particularly for the older generation. Enriched with local flavours, Hainanese opera is part and parcel of Hainanese culture.

See also
Thai Chinese
Cantonese people

References

Hainan
Hainanese people